Ángel Rodrigo Romero Villamayor (born 4 July 1992), more commonly known as Ángel Romero, is a Paraguayan professional footballer who plays as a winger for Corinthians and the Paraguay national team. He is the twin brother of Óscar Romero.

Club career

Cerro Porteño
Romero made his senior league debut for Cerro Porteño on 15 May 2011, playing the full 90 minutes in a 1–0 loss to General Caballero.

Corinthians
On 3 June 2014, it was reported that Romero would be transferred to Brazil's Sport Club Corinthians Paulista where he would sign a five-year contract.

San Lorenzo
On August 8, 2019, he signed with San Lorenzo for three seasons.On August 31, he scored his first goal for the club, in a 2-1 victory over Unión, in a match valid for the Argentine Championship.On August 28, 2020, the club announced the termination of the contract with the athlete, as a way of complying with the financial fair play implemented by the Professional League.

Cruz Azul
On 2 February 2022, he was announced by Cruz Azul, with a contract valid until December 2022.

International career
Romero made his debut for Paraguay on 6 September 2013, playing 65 minutes in a 2014 FIFA World Cup qualification (CONMEBOL) 4–0 win over Bolivia.

Career statistics

Club

International goals

Scores and results list Paraguay's goal tally first, score column indicates score after each Romero goal.

Honours
Corinthians
Campeonato Brasileiro Série A: 2015, 2017
Campeonato Paulista: 2017, 2018

Cruz Azul
Supercopa de la Liga MX: 2022

References

1992 births
Living people
People from Fernando de la Mora, Paraguay
Paraguayan twins
Twin sportspeople
Association football forwards
Paraguayan footballers
Paraguayan expatriate footballers
Cerro Porteño players
Sport Club Corinthians Paulista players
Paraguayan Primera División players
Campeonato Brasileiro Série A players
San Lorenzo de Almagro footballers
Argentine Primera División players
Paraguay international footballers
Expatriate footballers in Brazil
Expatriate footballers in Argentina
Paraguayan expatriate sportspeople in Brazil